Ngaheremyia is a monotypic hybotid fly genus endemic to New Zealand. The sole species is Ngaheremyia fuscipennis.

Further reading
See the Wikispecies link below for more details and full references.

Hybotidae
Diptera of New Zealand
Brachycera genera